Stereocaulon depressum is a species of snow lichen belonging to the family Stereocaulaceae.

Ecology
Stereocaulon depressum is a known host to the lichenicolous fungus species:

 Arthonia stereocaulina
 Catillaria stereocaulorum
 Cercidospora stereocaulorum
 Dactylospora deminuta
 Diploschistes muscorum
 Lasiosphaeriopsis stereocaulicola
 Lichenopeltella stereocaulorum
 Niesslia peltigericola
 Opegrapha stereocaulicola
 Phaeosporobolus alpinus
 Polycoccum trypethelioides
 Rhymbocarpus stereocaulorum
 Taeniolella christiansenii

References

Stereocaulaceae
Lichen species
Lichens described in 1932